Maltase-glucoamylase, intestinal is an enzyme that in humans is encoded by the MGAM gene.

Maltase-glucoamylase is an alpha-glucosidase digestive enzyme. It consists of two subunits with differing substrate specificity. Recombinant enzyme studies have shown that its N-terminal catalytic domain has highest activity against maltose, while the C-terminal domain has a broader substrate specificity and activity against glucose oligomers. In the small intestine, this enzyme works in synergy with sucrase-isomaltase and alpha-amylase to digest the full range of dietary starches.

Gene 

The MGAM gene –– which is located on chromosome 7q34  –– codes for the protein Maltase-Glucoamylase. An alternative name for Maltase-Glucoamylase is glucan 1,4-alpha-glycosidase.

Tissue distribution 
Maltase-glucoamylase is a membrane-bound enzyme located in the intestinal walls. This lining of the intestine forms brush border in which food has to pass in order for the intestines to absorb the food.

Enzymatic mechanism 

This enzyme is a part of a family of enzymes called glycoside hydrolase family 31 (GH31). This is due to the digestive mechanism of the enzyme. GH31 enzymes undergo what is known as the Koshland double displacement mechanism in which a glycosylation and deglycosylation step occurs, resulting in the retention of the overall configuration of the anomeric center.

Structure

N-terminal maltase 

The N-terminal maltase-glucoamylase enzymatic unit is in turn composed of 5 specific protein domains. The first of the 5 protein domains consist of a P-type trefoil domain containing a cysteine rich domain. Second is an N-terminal beta-sandwich domain, identified via two antiparallel beta pleated sheets. The third and largest domain consists of a catalytic (beta/alpha) barrel type domain containing two inserted loops. The fourth and 5th domains are C-terminal domains, similar to the N-terminal beta-sandwich domain. The N-terminal Maltase-glucoamylase does not have the +2/+3 sugar binding active sites and so it cannot bind to larger substrates. The N-terminal domain shows its optimal enzymatic affinity for substrates maltose, maltotriose, maltotetrose, and maltopentose.

C-terminal glucase 

The C-terminal glucase enzymatic unit contains extra binding sites, which allows for it to bind to larger substrates for catalytic digestion. It was originally understood that maltase-glucoamylase's crystalline structure was inherently similar throughout the N and C-termini. Further studies have found that the C-terminus is composed of 21 more amino acid residues than the N-terminus, which account for its difference in function. Sucrase-Isomaltase –– located on chromosome 3q26–– has a similar crystalline structure to maltase-glucoamylase and work in tandem in the human small intestine. They have been derived from a common ancestor, as they both come from the same GH31 family. As a result of having similar properties, both of these enzymes work together in the small intestine in order to convert consumed starch into glucose for metabolic energy. The difference between these two enzymes is that maltase-glucoamylase has a specific activity at the 1-4 linkage of sugar, where at SI has a specific activity at the 1-6 linkage.

See also 
 Alpha-glucosidase
 Maltase

References

Further reading

External links 
 PDBe-KB provides an overview of all the structure information available in the PDB for Human Maltase-glucoamylase, intestinal

Human proteins